Eric Tansley Holah (born 3 August 1937) is an English former professional footballer who played as a forward.

Career
Born in Hull, Holah played for Malet Lambert OB before signing for Hull City, making one Football League appearance. He signed for Bradford City in July 1961, leaving the club in 1962. During his time with Bradford City he made four appearances in the Football League, scoring twice.

Sources

References

1937 births
Living people
English footballers
Hull City A.F.C. players
Bradford City A.F.C. players
English Football League players
Association football forwards